Senmatsu Dam  is a gravity dam located in Iwate Prefecture in Japan. The dam is used for irrigation. The catchment area of the dam is 1.3 km2. The dam impounds about 4  ha of land when full and can store 260 thousand cubic meters of water. The construction of the dam was started on 1983 and completed in 1998.

See also
List of dams in Japan

References

Dams in Iwate Prefecture